Tyuliganovo (Tülägön) is a rural locality (a village) in Bishkurayevsky Selsoviet, Ilishevsky District, Bashkortostan, Russia. The population was 178 as of 2010. There are 3 streets.

Geography 
Tyuliganovo is located 31 km southeast of Verkhneyarkeyevo (the district's administrative centre) by road. Malo-Bishkurayevo is the nearest rural locality.

References 

Rural localities in Ilishevsky District